Laila Bērziņa (born 1965) is a Latvian politician who is a deputy of Līgatne City Council belonging to the New Era Party, currently she also work as a school teacher.

References 

New Era Party politicians
Living people
1965 births
Place of birth missing (living people)
21st-century Latvian women politicians